Caninia is an extinct genus of rugose coral. Its fossils occur worldwide from the Devonian to the Permian periods.

Paleoecology
It was marine in nature and known to live in lagoon-type ecosystems. Because of the shallow water in which it lived, Caninia was often affected by processes above the water level, such as storms.

Distribution

References

Rugosa
Prehistoric Hexacorallia genera
Devonian first appearances
Permian genus extinctions
Paleozoic life of Alberta
Paleozoic life of the Northwest Territories
Paleozoic life of Nunavut